The 2014–15 Algerian Ligue Professionnelle 1 was the 53rd season of the Algerian Ligue Professionnelle 1 since its establishment in 1962. A total of 16 teams contested the league, with USM Alger as the defending champions. Following the death of Albert Ebossé Bodjongo, the Algerian Football Federation suspended all football indefinitely. The league resumed on Week 3 starting 12 September 2014, with all matches on that week were preceded with a minute silence in memory of Ebossé.

Team summaries

Promotion and relegation 
Teams promoted from 2013–14 Algerian Ligue Professionnelle 2
 ASM Oran
 NA Hussein Dey
 USM Bel-Abbès

Teams relegated to 2014-15 Algerian Ligue Professionnelle 2
 CA Bordj Bou Arréridj
 CRB Aïn Fakroun
 JSM Béjaïa

Stadiums and locations

Primary venues used in the Ligue 1:

Personnel and kits

Results

League table

RC Arbaâ was to participate in the 2016 CAF Confederation Cup as a runners-up of the 2014–15 Algerian Cup in place of MO Béjaïa, because MO Béjaïa take part to 2016 CAF Champions League as a runners-up to a championship. However RC Arbaâ withdrew from the competition because that does not have a Fifa license, it was replaced by CS Constantine.

Result table

Leader week after week

Positions by round

Clubs season-progress

Season statistics

Top scorers

Hat-tricks

Media coverage

See also
2014–15 Algerian Ligue Professionnelle 2
2014–15 Algerian Cup

References

Algerian Ligue Professionnelle 1 seasons
Algeria
1